Sailors Run is a stream in Noble County in Ohio. It is a tributary of Duck Creek (Ohio).  It flows into Duck Creek "a short distance below Carlisle".

Sailors Run was named for Jacob Sailor, a pioneer who settled there.

See also
List of rivers of Ohio

References

Rivers of Noble County, Ohio
Rivers of Ohio